Abhishek Santosh Raut (born 3 March 1987 in Odisha, India) is an Indian cricketer. Raut made his debut in first-class cricket on 17–20 Dec 2005. He is an aggressive right-handed batsman and a right-arm Legbreak Bowler. He was signed by the Rajasthan Royals in the Indian Premier League. In the 2008 IPL season, he made his debut in IPL, scoring 21 runs in 13 balls.

Career 
Raut did not play in any matches of the IPL Season 1.

In season two, he played 9 matches, scoring 78 runs with the average of 19.5. His top score was 36 against Deccan Chargers, a match winning performance. He hit 5 fours and 3 sixes in the whole season.

In season three, Raut played 6 matches in the third season scoring 56 runs with the average of 28. His top score was 31. He hit 3 fours and 3 sixes in the whole season.

References

External links
 
 

Living people
1987 births
Indian cricketers
Maharashtra cricketers
Rajasthan Royals cricketers
Mumbai cricketers
Goa cricketers
Odisha cricketers
Cricketers from Odisha
People from Jajpur district